In 1825, three vessels were launched at Quebec and named Sir Francis N. Burton or Sir Francis Burton for Lieutenant-Governor Francis Nathaniel Burton. The launching of three vessels of the same name in Quebec in the same year has led to some confusion in subsequent reports.

  was launched in 1825 in Quebec. She assumed British registry on 6 January 1826. Pirates plundered her in 1828. She was wrecked on 7 November 1829.
  was launched in 1825 at Quebec. She was wrecked on 5 December 1826 on a voyage for the British East India Company (EIC).
  was launched at Quebec. She assumed British registry on 5 October 1827. She made several voyages to India under a license from the EIC. She was wrecked on 16 February 1838.

Citations

Ship names